Monga is a 2010 Taiwanese gangster film set in 1980s Taipei. The film features Ethan Juan, Mark Chao, Ma Ju-lung, Rhydian Vaughan and Ko Chia-yen. The film was directed and co-written by Doze Niu, who also appears in the film.

Plot
Monga (now known as Wanhua District) is one of Taipei's districts. Mosquito (Mark Chao) and his friends have no illusions about the unwritten laws that prevail in this part of town: if you want to survive here, you've got to have the friends that make you stronger than your enemies.

Mosquito (Mark Chao), Monk (Ethan Juan), Dragon (Rhydian Vaughan), Monkey (Emerson Tsai) and A-po (Frankie Huang) are all members of the "Gang of Princes". Mosquito is invited to join the gang after standing up to – and holding his own against – a rival gang member who stole his chicken drumstick his first day at school in Monga. Mosquito soon begins to enjoy with his brother gangsters the lifestyle, and gains leadership over the "Gang of Princes," the influence of which dominates the streets of Monga. They are unaware that there are other rivals who are deeply jealous of their success, and the five's responses to antagonism that follows reflects their commitment to the code of brotherhood, but lack judgement, maturity, and the ever-important calculation required to balance power in gang leadership.

Geta (Ma Ju-lung), one of Monga's old triad leaders (as well as Dragon's father), sees it as his duty to teach these cheeky young upstarts the true laws of gangsterdom. To accomplish this, while punishing them for their previous actions, Geta orders the seclusion of the five, as they undergo intense training according to the tradition and legacy handed down by the city's founders.  The strict laws of a brotherhood, in which they should fight not just for territorial reasons, but also to protect their honor, impress most deeply on Mosquito.

But even Geta has no inkling of the storm that is about to hit Monga – a storm that will destroy the town's traditional values and the vestiges of its glory. A new gang, bristling with an arsenal of handguns, is about to change forever the little world in which Geta and the "Gang of Princes" have made themselves at home, as cracks of a former betrayal come to light, widen, and result in conflicting loyalties that confuse the ties between gangsterdom and sworn brotherhood.

Cast
 Mark Chao as Mosquito 周以文 (蚊子).
 Ethan Juan as Monk
 Rhydian Vaughan as Dragon Lee
 Frankie Huang as A-po
 Emerson Tsai as Monkey
 Ma Ju-lung as Boss Geta
 Doze Niu as Grey Wolf
 Wang Shih-hsien as Wim-kian
 Ko Chia-yen as Ning
 Chen Han-dian as Dog boy
 Bamboo Chen as Geta's assistant

Production

Filming
Monga is set in mid-1980s in Wanhua (萬華) (in Basay language, Bangka; in Taiwanese Hokkien, Báng-kah, 艋舺) of Lungshan District, Taipei City (臺北市龍山區) for which it is named. The movie was filmed on location and landmarks such as Bangka Qingshui Temple (艋舺清水巖), Bangka Lungshan Temple (艋舺龍山寺), Snake Alley (華西街夜市), Bopiliao (剝皮寮) and Ximending (西門町) appear in the film.

Music
The majority of the film's original score was composed by Sandee Chan, a Taiwanese singer-songwriter. The theme song of the film is "Making Love Out of Nothing at All" by Nicky Lee (李玖哲). It was originally performed by Air Supply.

Release
Monga premiered at the 60th Berlin International Film Festival on 29 January 2010, in the Panorama section.

The film opened in Taiwan on 5 February 2010, and grossed NT$8.31 million (US$260,000) on its opening day and NT$59.32 million (US$1.85 million) on its opening week, ranking above worldwide hit Avatar on the box-office charts.

China Daily placed the film on their list of the best ten Chinese films of 2010.

Awards and nominations
2010 Taipei Film Awards
Won: Best Art Direction

Won: Best New Actor (Mark Chao)

Nominated: Best actor (Ethan Juan and Mark Chao)

Nominated: The Grand Prize

2010 54th Asia-Pacific Film Festival 
Nominated: Best Actor (Mark Chao)

2010 Hawaii International Film Festival
Won: Network for the Promotion of Asian Cinema Award

2010 Tokyo International Film Festival
Nominated: Best Asian-Middle Eastern Film Award

2010 Stockholm International Film Festival
Won: Telia Film Award

2010 Golden Horse Awards
Won: Best Leading Actor (Ethan Juan)

Won: The Outstanding Taiwanese Filmmaker of the Year (Lee Lieh)

Won: Best Sound Effects

Nominated: Best Original Film Score (Sandee Chan)

Nominated: Best Art Direction

Nominated: The Outstanding Taiwanese Filmmaker of the Year (Doze Niu)

2011 5th Asian Film Awards
Won: Best New Actor (Mark Chao)

2011 11th Chinese Film Media Awards
Nominated: Best New Actor (Mark Chao)

The film was selected as the Taiwanese entry for the Best Foreign Language Film at the 83rd Academy Awards but it did not make the final shortlist.

See also
 List of submissions to the 83rd Academy Awards for Best Foreign Language Film
 List of Taiwanese submissions for the Academy Award for Best Foreign Language Film

References

External links

2010 films
Films set in the 1980s
Films set in Taiwan
Taiwanese crime drama films
Taiwanese-language films
Films directed by Doze Niu
Gangster films
Triad films
2010s Mandarin-language films
2010s Hong Kong films